Demetrius I Qadi (or Dimitros I Cadi) (January 18, 1861, Damascus, Syria – October 25, 1925)  was Patriarch of Antioch and All the East, and Alexandria and Jerusalem of the Melkite Greek Catholic Church from 1919 until 1925.

Life
Joseph Qadi was born in Damascus, Syria. Ordained a Melkite priest in 1888, Qadi was appointed Patriarchal Vicar of Jerusalem in 1895, resigning in 1898. he was elected eparch of Aleppo on October 27, 1903 and ordained eparch on November 29, 1903 by patriarch Cyril VIII Jaha, being Gaudenzio Bonfigli, O.F.M, titular bishop of Cabasa, and Joseph Dumani, BS, Eparch of Tripoli, his co-consecrators.  On March 29, 1919 he was elected patriarch by the Melkite Synod of Bishops, with the Holy See accepting his request for ecclesiastical communion on July 3 of the same year. At that point the patriarchate had been vacant for three years since the death of Cyril VIII Jaha in 1916.

During his brief reign the Melkite Church experienced a rapid expansion in the Near East as situations for the Greek Catholics improved during the period of the French Mandate for Syria and the Lebanon. Demetrius also began radical reforms in the Melkite Church, including preparations for Melkite councils to address canonical matters. However, Demetrius did not live to participate in these councils, and died on October 25, 1925. He was succeeded upon his death by Patriarch Cyril IX Moghabghab.

Consecrator of Melkite Eparchs

During his patriarchate he was consecrator of some Melkite eparchs:

 Maximos IV Sayegh, Archeparch of Tyre
 Etienne Soukkarie, Titular Archbishop of Myra dei Greco-Melkiti and Patriarchal Vicar of Alexandria in Egypt
 Basil Khoury, Archeparch of Homs
 Basil Cattan, Archeparch of Beirut and Byblos
 Anthony Farage, Titular bishop of Laodicea in Syria per i Melchiti and Patriarchal Procurator in Antioch
 Meletius Abou-Assaleh, Eparch of Baalbek in Lebanon 
 Joseph Kallas, Eparch of Tripoli in Lebanon

Distinctions
 Order of Saint Lazarus (statuted 1910)

See also
 Melkite Greek Catholic Patriarchate of Antioch and All the East
 Melkite Greek Catholic Church

Notes

External links
 http://www.catholic-hierarchy.org/bishop/bcadi.html
 http://www.gcatholic.org/dioceses/diocese/anti2.htm

1861 births
1925 deaths
Melkite Greek Catholic Patriarchs of Antioch
Syrian Melkite Greek Catholics
Eastern Catholic bishops in Syria